The 2008 NCAA Division III baseball tournament was played at the end of the 2008 NCAA Division III baseball season to determine the 33rd national champion of college baseball at the NCAA Division III level. The tournament concluded with eight teams competing at Time Warner Cable Field at Fox Cities Stadium in Grand Chute, Wisconsin for the championship. Eight regional tournaments were held to determine the participants in the World Series. Regional tournaments were contested in double-elimination format, with five regions consisting of six teams and three consisting of eight, for a total of 54 teams participating in the tournament, up from 53 in 2007.

Bids
The 54 competing teams were:

Regionals

Mid-Atlantic Regional
Bears & Eagles Riverfront Stadium-Newark, NJ (Host: Kean University)

West Regional
Walt Driggers Field-Abilene, TX (Host: McMurry University)

South Regional
American Legion Field-Danville, GA (Host: USA South Athletic Conference/Old Dominion Athletic Conference)

Mideast Regional
Art Nehf Field-Terre Haute, IN (Host: Rose-Hulman Institute of Technology)

Central Regional
Brunner Field in the Duane R. Swanson Stadium-Moline, IL (Host: Augustana College)

Midwest Regional
E.J. Schneider Field-Oshkosh, WI (Host: University of Wisconsin-Oshkosh)

New England Regional
Whitehouse Field-Harwich, MA (Host: Eastern College Athletic Conference)

New York Regional
Leo Pinckney Field at Falcon Park-Auburn, NY (Host: Ithaca College)

World Series
Time Warner Cable Field at Fox Cities Stadium-Grand Chute, WI (Host: University of Wisconsin-Oshkosh/Lawrence University/Fox Cities Convention and Visitors Bureau)

References

NCAA Division III Baseball Tournament
2008 college baseball season